Fungi of the order Chytridiales, like other members of its division, may either have a monocentric thallus or a polycentric rhizomycelium. When the ribosomal genes of members classified in this order were first examined using molecular techniques, it was discovered that the order contained some species that were not related. With the culture and characterization of  Chytridium olla, the type species of this order, the limits of the Chytridiales were established. The Chytridiales is now monophyletic and species such as Polychytrium aggregatum, Chytriomyces angularis and Cladochytrium replicatum  have been transferred to other orders.

Genera incertae sedis

 Achlyella
 Achlyogeton 
 Coralliochytrium
 Delfinachytrium
 Pseudorhizidium
 Dermomycoides
 Dictyomorpha
 Ichthyochytrium
 Mucophilus
 Myiophagus
 Plasmophagus
 Rhizidiocystis
 Rhizosiphon
 Sagittospora
 Septolpidium
 Sorokinocystis - Sorokinocystis mirabilis 
 Trematophlyctis

References

Chytridiomycota
Fungus orders
Aquatic fungi